The ARIA Streaming Chart ranks the best-performing streaming tracks of Australia. It is published by Australian Recording Industry Association (ARIA), an organisation who collects music data for the weekly ARIA Charts.

Chart history

See also
2020 in music
ARIA Charts
List of number-one singles of 2020 (Australia)

References

Australia Streaming
Streaming 2020
Number-one Streaming Songs